François Fortassin (2 August 1939 – 15 May 2017) was a French politician and a member of the Senate of France. He represented the Hautes-Pyrénées department and was a secretary of the Senate and a member of the Radical Party of the Left.

References

Page on the Senate website

1939 births
2017 deaths
Radical Party of the Left politicians
French Senators of the Fifth Republic
People from Hautes-Pyrénées
Senators of Hautes-Pyrénées